A constitutional referendum was held in Madagascar on 21 December 1975. The new constitution created a presidential republic, with the president serving seven-year terms and incumbent President Didier Ratsiraka was to serve the first term without being elected. It also created a High Revolutionary Council to create a "socialist revolution" and a military committee to oversee socio-economic development. Madagascar was transformed into the Democratic Republic of Madagascar. All political parties with the exception of those "loyal to the socialist revolution" were to be banned, and those that were allowed to exist would have to be affiliated with the National Front for the Defense of the Revolution, which was led by Ratsiraka's AREMA party.

The constitution was approved by 95.57% of voters with a 92% voter turnout.

Results

References

Referendums in Madagascar
Madagascar
1975 in Madagascar
Constitutional referendums in Madagascar
Madagascar